Las majas refers to a pair of paintings by Francisco de Goya:

 La maja vestida
 La maja desnuda